Elandskuil Dam is a dam on the Swartleegte River, North West, South Africa. It is located in Middle Vaal. The purpose of the dam is for improved irrigation of the local area. It was built in 1969.

See also
List of reservoirs and dams in South Africa
List of rivers of South Africa

References 

 List of South African Dams from the Department of Water Affairs

Dams in South Africa